The Cleveland mayoral election of 1953 saw the election of Anthony J. Celebrezze.

General election

References

Mayoral elections in Cleveland
Cleveland mayoral
Cleveland
November 1953 events in the United States
1950s in Cleveland